Monticello School District may refer to:

 Monticello School District, based in Monticello, Arkansas.
 Monticello Community Unified School District 25, based in Monticello, Illinois.
 Monticello Community School District, based in Monticello, Iowa.
 Monticello Independent Schools, based in Monticello, Kentucky.
 Monticello School District, based in Monticello, Minnesota.
 Monticello Central School District, based in Monticello, New York.
 Monticello School District, based in Monticello, Wisconsin.